David John Sabine (born 6 June 1966) is a New Zealand born former English cricketer. Sabine played as a right-handed batsman who bowled right-arm medium pace. He was born at Papakura near Auckland.

Sabine made a single first-class cricket appearance for Kent County Cricket Club against the touring West Indians at the St Lawrence Ground in 1988. In the same season he made a single List A appearance against Sussex at Mote Park in the Refuge Assurance League. These were his only senior appearances for Kent, although he played Second XI cricket for the county between 1984 and 1989.

References

External links

1966 births
Living people
Cricketers from Auckland
English cricketers
Kent cricketers
People from Papakura